Peter Ransley is a British screenwriter, playwright and novelist. He also founded the charity Action Against Medical Accidents (AvMA).

Early life 
Peter Ransley was born in Yorkshire in 1931 and grew up in Pudsey where he attended Pudsey Grammar School. In 1949, he served his national service with the RAF based in Singapore at Changi Airport. He subsequently worked as a trade journalist.

Career 
Ransley started his writing career on the stage with Runaway at the Royal Court, Ellen at the Hampstead Theatre Club and Disabled both at Hampstead and the Stables Theatre Club. He moved to writing for the radio and television. In the early 1980s, he wrote episodes of Tales of the Unexpected and single plays for the BBC Play for Today Series. His Kate the Good Neighbour won the gold medal in the Commonwealth Film and TV Festival in 1980, while  Minor Complications, based on a real case of medical negligence, gained him the Royal Television Society's Writer's Award in 1981. In 1986, Ransley's's mini-series The Price was nominated for a BAFTA for Best Drama.

TV productions include Fallen Angel (ITV 2007), A Good Murder (BBC1 2006) and the BAFTA nominated adaptation of Sarah Waters’ Fingersmith (BBC1 2005). Ransley has written a number of films including The Hawk (1993) which starred Helen Mirren and The Cormorant (1995) which starred Ralph Fiennes.

Ransley has also focused on historical fiction with television dramas Bread or Blood (1981) and Seaforth (1994).  He subsequently wrote the "Tom Neave" trilogy of novels based around the English civil war  (published between 2012 and 2015).

Ransley wrote Wild Boy, a nine year old's quest to find his father, published in 2020.

Activism
In 1980, the BBC aired "Minor Complications" - a Play for Today written by Ransley. The play was based on a real case of medical negligence, and public response to the play led to his setting up AvMA together with his wife Cynthia and its first chief executive, Arnold Simanowitz. AvMA is a UK charity for patient safety and justice, providing free independent advice and support to people affected by medical accidents.

Personal life 
Ransley lives with his wife Cynthia in West London. They have two children.

References 

Living people
1931 births